Fantastic Carburetor Man is the sixth studio album by Dogbowl, independently released in 2001 by Eyeball Planet.

Track listing

Personnel 
Adapted from Fantastic Carburetor Man liner notes.

 Dogbowl – vocals, instruments, production, engineering, cover art

Release history

References

External links 
 Fantastic Carburetor Man at Discogs (list of releases)

2001 albums
Dogbowl albums